Lyndon Andrews (born 20 January 1976) is a football midfielder from Trinidad and Tobago.

International career
He earned 45 caps for the national team between 1996 and 2005.

Clubs
 Superstar Rangers (1994–1996)
 Joe Public (1997–1999) 30 Lge apps (3 Goals)
 W Connection (1999–2000)
 Hibernian (2000–2002) 13 Lge apps
 W Connection (2002–2003)
 South Starworld Strikers (2004) (5 Goals)
 Joe Public (2005–2008) (4 Goals)
 Ma Pau SC (2009-2011) 41 lge apps (3 Goals)

References

External links

1976 births
Living people
Trinidad and Tobago footballers
Hibernian F.C. players
Trinidad and Tobago international footballers
Scottish Premier League players
Expatriate footballers in Scotland
W Connection F.C. players
South Starworld Strikers F.C. players
Joe Public F.C. players
TT Pro League players
St. Ann's Rangers F.C. players
1998 CONCACAF Gold Cup players
Association football midfielders
1996 CONCACAF Gold Cup players